Bank of Dave is a British biographical comedy film directed by Chris Foggin, written by Piers Ashworth and produced by Matt Williams, Karl Hall, Ridoyanul Hoq, Piers Tempest. The film stars Joel Fry, Phoebe Dynevor, Rory Kinnear, Hugh Bonneville, Paul Kaye, Jo Hartley and Cathy Tyson.

Bank of Dave was released in the United Kingdom on 16 January 2023 by Netflix.

Plot
The film is based on the real-life experiences of Dave Fishwick. It follows the story of a Burnley working class and self-made millionaire, who struggles to set up a community bank to help the town's local businesses to thrive. To do so, he must battle London's elite financial institutions and compete for the first banking licence in over 100 years.

Cast
Joel Fry as Hugh
Phoebe Dynevor as Alexandra
Rory Kinnear as Dave
Hugh Bonneville as Sir Charles
Angus Wright as Clarence
Paul Kaye as Rick Purdey
Jo Hartley as Nicola Fishwick
Cathy Tyson as Maureen
Naomi Battrick as Henrietta
Florence Hall as Meghan
Drew Cain as Prosecutor
Grant Crookes as Press
Joanne James as Pub Patron
Amanda Marchant as Pub Patron

Production
Netflix acquired the film rights of Bank of Dave, with Piers Ashworth writing and Chris Foggin directing the film under the production companies Tempo Productions Limited, Future Artists Entertainment, Ingenious Media and Rojovid Films. Pre-production began on 8 January 2022 and filming commenced on 28 February 2022. The film was in post-production between 18 April 2022 and 27 September 2022, and the film was completed on 22 December 2022.

Although some scenes were filmed in and around Burnley, most of the production was filmed in Bradford, Leeds and Wakefield in Yorkshire, including City Hall in Bradford, Production Park in Wakefield, with most of the pub and cafes scenes filmed in Leeds.

Critical reception
Writing in The Guardian, Cath Clarke judged that, "Rory Kinnear is brilliant as Fishwick, who made his fortune selling vans and minibuses but has never forgotten his roots", adding that, "Kinnear gives the character a winning mix of down-to-earth blokiness with a rags-to-riches flamboyance (and a bit of ego to match the flash car)". However, Clarke found that "[t]he rest of the characters feel as if they might have been generated by an algorithm" although she noted that "Hugh Bonneville gives good sneer as a fatcat banker". Overall, she decided, "It’s a film with a decent bit of charm, and it’s hard to argue with the greed-is-bad message. [...] But an artificial taste ruins a fair few scenes".

References

External links
 

2020s British films
2023 comedy films
2023 films
British biographical films
British comedy films
2020s English-language films
2020s biographical films
English-language Netflix original films
Films about banking
Films set in Lancashire